Carl Ernest Sawatski (November 4, 1927 – November 24, 1991) was an American professional baseball player and executive. In the Major Leagues, he was a catcher for the Chicago Cubs (1948, 1950 and 1953), Chicago White Sox (1954), Milwaukee Braves (1957–58), Philadelphia Phillies (1958–59) and St. Louis Cardinals (1960–63). He also was an influential figure in minor league baseball.

Sawatski attended Pompton Lakes High School in Pompton Lakes, New Jersey, where he played football and basketball, in addition to baseball.

The native of Shickshinny, Pennsylvania, played 11 seasons in MLB, appearing in 633 games. His career totals include 1,449 at bats, 133 runs, 351 hits, 46 doubles, five triples, 58 home runs, 213 runs batted in, two stolen bases and 191 walks, and batted .242.

Sawatski helped the Braves win the  National League pennant, appearing in 58 games, 19 as a catcher (third-most among the club's backstops), and contributing six home runs to the Milwaukee cause. During the 1957 World Series against the New York Yankees, Sawatski had two appearances as a pinch hitter (Games 3 and 6) and struck out each time, but the Braves prevailed in seven games to win the world title.

Sawatski was a prodigious minor league hitter. He batted .352 and slugged 34 homers in the Class D North Atlantic League in 1947. Then, two seasons later, he led the Double-A Southern Association with 45 homers and batted .360, second in the league while playing for the Nashville Vols.. After his playing career ended, Sawatski served as the general manager of the Arkansas Travelers of the Double-A Texas League, a Cardinal affiliate, from 1967–75. He then was elected president of the Texas League itself and served in the post from 1976 until his 1991 death in Little Rock at the age of 64. During his presidency, the league prospered as part of the renaissance of minor league baseball that began in the 1980s.

References

External links

 Venezuelan Professional Baseball League statistics

1927 births
1991 deaths
American expatriate baseball players in Canada
American people of Polish descent
Baseball players from New Jersey
Baseball players from Pennsylvania
Bloomingdale Troopers players
Bradford Blue Wings players
Chicago Cubs players
Chicago White Sox players
Des Moines Bruins players
Leones del Caracas players
American expatriate baseball players in Venezuela
Major League Baseball catchers
Milwaukee Braves players
Minneapolis Millers (baseball) players
Minor league baseball executives
Nashville Vols players
People from Luzerne County, Pennsylvania
People from Pompton Lakes, New Jersey
Philadelphia Phillies players
Pompton Lakes High School alumni
St. Louis Cardinals players
Schenectady Blue Jays players
Sportspeople from Little Rock, Arkansas
Sportspeople from Passaic County, New Jersey
Toronto Maple Leafs (International League) players